Arp is a city in Smith County, in the U.S. state of Texas. It is part of the Tyler metropolitan statistical area. According to the United States Census Bureau. The population was 892 in the 2020 census.

History
The area where the town of Arp now sits was occupied by Caddoan peoples in pre-Columbian periods and was a part of the Treaty of Bowles Village in 1836 that granted Smith and Cherokee counties along with parts of Rusk, Gregg and Van Zandt counties to the Texas Cherokee and twelve associated tribes. The Cherokee War of 1839 forced the Native Americans out. However, the area was again occupied by Cherokee, Choctaw, Chickasaw and Creek Indians after 1845. The descendants of these people formed the Mount Tabor Indian Community and a number continue to reside in Smith and Rusk counties today.

The settlement that would become Arp was called Bissa, from the Choctaw/Chickasaw word for blackberry, as early as the 1800s. It was later called Jarvis Junction and then Strawberry, after the fruit that was grown in the area. It was finally renamed "Arp" for Bill Arp (pen name of Charles Henry Smith), a Georgia humorist who was nationally known in the late 19th century. Supposedly, the three-letter name was also chosen for its brevity, which allowed local strawberry producers to spend less time hand-marking their crates.

Geography

Arp is located at  (32.225794, –95.055140).

According to the United States Census Bureau, the city has a total area of 2.5 square miles (6.3 km2), all land.

Demographics

As of the 2020 United States census, there were 892 people, 383 households, and 292 families residing in the city.

As of the census of 2010, there were 970 people, 361 households, and 259 families residing in the city. The population density was 367.6 people per square mile (142.0/km2). There were 405 housing units at an average density of 165.2 per square mile (63.8/km2). The racial makeup of the city was 95.34% White, 3.22% African American, 0.11% Native American, 0.44% from other races, and 0.89% from two or more races. Hispanic or Latino of any race were 2.55% of the population.

There were 361 households, out of which 32.1% had children under the age of 18 living with them, 59.3% were married couples living together, 8.6% had a female householder with no husband present, and 28.0% were non-families. 26.3% of all households were made up of individuals, and 13.3% had someone living alone who was 65 years of age or older. The average household size was 2.50 and the average family size was 2.97.

In the city, the population was spread out, with 25.2% under the age of 18, 8.7% from 18 to 24, 27.3% from 25 to 44, 24.0% from 45 to 64, and 14.9% who were 65 years of age or older. The median age was 37 years. For every 100 females, there were 91.7 males. For every 100 females age 18 and over, there were 89.3 males.

The median income for a household in the city was $33,750, and the median income for a family was $38,807. Males had a median income of $27,443 versus $22,202 for females. The per capita income for the city was $16,619. About 4.2% of families and 4.9% of the population were below the poverty line, including 5.5% of those under age 18 and 6.2% of those age 65 or over.

Education
The City of Arp is served by the Arp Independent School District, and includes an elementary school, junior high school and high school.

Notable people

 Joe B. Foster, founder of Newfield Exploration
 Larry Henley, lead singer of the 1960s pop group The Newbeats and the composer of the Grammy Award-winning song Wind Beneath My Wings, born in Arp
 Guy Lewis, legendary men's basketball coach for Houston
 DeMarvion Overshown, college football linebacker for the Texas Longhorns, attended Arp High School

References

Cities in Texas
Cities in Smith County, Texas